The Hound of Silver Creek is a 1928 American drama film directed by Stuart Paton, and written by Paul M. Bryan and Gardner Bradford. The film stars Dynamite the Dog, Edmund Cobb, Gloria Grey, Gladden James, Billy "Red" Jones, and Frank Rice. The film was released on May 20, 1928, by Universal Pictures.

Cast        
Dynamite the Dog as Dynamite
Edmund Cobb as Jack Brooks
Gloria Grey as Molly White
Gladden James as Marvin Henley
Billy "Red" Jones as Spots Lawton
Frank Rice as Slim Terwilliger
Frank Clark as John Lawton

References

External links
 

1928 films
1920s English-language films
Silent American drama films
1928 drama films
Universal Pictures films
Films directed by Stuart Paton
American silent feature films
American black-and-white films
1920s American films